Nasal glioma  is a rare benign congenital lesion, usually a firm, incompressible, reddish-blue to purple lesion occurring on the nasal bridge or midline near the root.

See also 
 List of cutaneous conditions

References 

Cutaneous congenital anomalies